Évry-Courcouronnes is a commune in the southern suburbs of Paris, France, prefecture of the department of Essonne.

It was established on 1 January 2019 from the amalgamation of the communes of Évry and Courcouronnes.

The city is the home of the Genopole.

Population

Parks and recreation 
Parc-du-Lac Courcouronnes is a relatively large park with a walking trail and a small lake. It is home to the famous "Dame du Lac" climbing wall constructed by architect Pierre Szekely in 1975. The wall has been closed to the public for the entirety of the 21st century, however, trespassers continue to use it regularly.

Education 
 Institut Mines-Télécom Business School
 ENSIIE (National School of Computer Science for Industry and Business)
 Telecom SudParis
 University of Évry Val d'Essonne

References

External links

Communes of Essonne
Communes nouvelles of Essonne
Prefectures in France
Populated places established in 2019
2019 establishments in France
Essonne communes articles needing translation from French Wikipedia